Gbagbam (also known as Grand Babam) is a town in southern Ivory Coast. It is a sub-prefecture of Fresco Department in Gbôklé Region, Bas-Sassandra District.

Gbagbam was a commune until March 2012, when it became one of 1126 communes nationwide that were abolished.

In 2014, the population of the sub-prefecture of Gbagbam was 23,649.

Villages
The six villages of the sub-prefecture of Gbagbam and their population in 2014 are:
 Digbodou (549)
 Gabililié (1 920)
 Gbagbam (13 654)
 Grogbaledou (3 523)
 Kroukrou (2 918)
 Zakpaberi (1 085)

References

Sub-prefectures of Gbôklé
Former communes of Ivory Coast